Corporación Estatal de Radio y Televisión (CERTV, State Radio and Television Corporation) is a radio and television network operating from Santo Domingo in the Dominican Republic. It is a public television channel operated and owned by the Dominican government. Following the frequency unification of 1996, CERTV has been aired throughout the country on channel 4 (canal 4). Previously, channel 4 was broadcast in Santo Domingo and the Southern zone, channel 5 in the Northern region and channel 12 in the Southwest.

History
The channel was first aired on August 1, 1952 with the name La Voz Dominicana. This was the first television transmitter of its kind in the country and the fifth in Latin America, after Mexico, Brazil, Cuba, and Argentina. The original owner was José Arismendy Trujillo (Petán), brother of the notorious dictator Rafael Trujillo (d. 1961). It was a combination of radio and television that transmitted live programming for six hours. Romance Campesino was one of the first television and radio series that aired from the station. Besides providing entertainment and information, this media outlet was also used by the government to communicate favorable propaganda for the Trujillo regime.

During the 1970s, the channel was officially renamed Radio Televisión Dominicana (RTVD), a title which persisted for several decades. On July 29, 2003 its name was changed once again to Corporación Estatal de Radio y Televisión (CERTV) by means of a national decree which transformed it into a public company sustained and operated by the Dominican Government.

CERTV: Definition and Functions
According to Article 4 of the law which created it (134-03), CERTV has a general objective of managing and running public telecommunication for the transport and diffusion of television signals in VHF (Very high frequency) and UHF (Ultra high frequency) and television systems for coaxial cable, equivalent to public broadcasting networks for medium and short wave and frequency modulated for the transmission and broadcasting of radio and TV programming, as well as the transmission and broadcasting of these programs by other media types that exists or could exist in the future.

List of Programs seen in this channel
 Centro Noticias 
 Centro Deportes 
 Caribe Show 
 El Tapón de las 12 
 TV Revista 
 El Kan del 4 
 Domingos en Grande 
 El Reto Semana - Primera Etapa 
 El Club de Isha - Primera Etapa 
 El Show del Mediodía - Primera Etapa 
 El Gordo de la Semana - Primera Etapa 
 Buen Provecho 
 Santo Domingo Invita 
 En Acción con Manuel y Hermes 
 El humor nunca pasa

Notes

Television stations in the Dominican Republic
Mass media companies established in 1952
Television channels and stations established in 1952
1952 establishments in the Dominican Republic